The Argentavis (Argentavis magnificens), sometimes called the Giant Teratorn, is an extinct species known from three sites in the Epecuén and Andalhualá Formations in central and northwestern Argentina dating to the Late Miocene (Huayquerian), where a good sample of fossils has been obtained. It was among the largest flying birds ever to exist. While it is still considered the heaviest flying bird of all time, Argentavis was likely surpassed in wingspan by Pelagornis sandersi which is estimated to have possessed wings some 20% longer than Argentavis and which was described in 2014.

Description 
The single known humerus (upper arm bone) specimen of Argentavis is somewhat damaged. Even so, it allows a fairly accurate estimate of its length in life. Argentavis humerus was only slightly shorter than an entire human arm. The species apparently had stout, strong legs and large feet which enabled it to walk with ease. The bill was large, rather slender, and had a hooked tip with a wide gape.

Size 

Argentavis wingspan estimates varied widely depending on the method used for scaling, i.e. regression analyses or comparisons with the California condor. Whether this span could have reached  appears uncertain per modern authorities.

New World vultures such as the condor are thought to be the closest living relations to Argentavis and other teratorns.

The ability to fly is not a simple question of weight ratios, except in extreme cases; size and structure of the wing must also be taken into account. As a rule of thumb, a wing loading of 25 kg/m2 is considered the limit for avian flight.

The largest flying creatures overall that are known to have existed are not birds, but instead distantly-related archosaurs, namely the azhdarchid pterosaurs of the Cretaceous. The wingspans of larger azhdarchids, such as Quetzalcoatlus and Hatzegopteryx, have been estimated to exceed , with less conservative estimates being  or more.

Currently accepted estimates for the size of Argentavis are:

 Wingspan: 
 Wing area: 
 Wing loading: 84.6 N/m2 (1.77 lb/ft2)
 Body length: 
 Height: 
 Mass:

Paleobiology

Life history 
Climate considerations make it likely that the birds incubated over the winter, mates exchanging duties of incubating and procuring food every few days, and that the young were independent after some 16 months, but not fully mature until aged about a dozen years. Mortality must have been very low; to maintain a viable population less than about 2% of birds may have died each year. Because of its large size and ability to fly, Argentavis suffered hardly any predation, and mortality was mainly from old age and disease.

Flight 
From the size and structure of its wings, it is inferred that A. magnificens flew mainly by soaring, using flapping flight only during short periods. It is probable that it used thermal currents as well. Especially for takeoff, it would have depended on the wind. Although its legs were strong enough to provide it with a running or jumping start, the wings were simply too long to flap effectively until the bird was some height off the ground. However, skeletal evidence suggests that its breast muscles were not powerful enough for wing flapping for extended periods. Argentavis may have used mountain slopes and headwinds to take off, and probably could manage to do so from even gently sloping terrain with little effort. It may have flown and lived much like the modern Andean condor, scanning large areas of land from aloft for carrion. The climate of the Andean foothills in Argentina during the late Miocene was warmer and drier than today, which would have further aided the bird in staying aloft atop thermal updrafts.

Studies on condor flight indicate that Argentavis was fully capable of flight in normal conditions as modern large soaring birds spend very little time flapping their wings regardless of environment.

Feeding 
This species seems less aerodynamically suited for predation than its relatives. It probably preferred to scavenge for carrion, and it is possible that it habitually chased metatherian carnivores such as Thylacosmilidae from their kills. The largest land predators in Miocene South America were the giant, ground-dwelling "terror birds", the phorusrhacids. Phorusrhacids were probably the most formidable rivals that Argentavis faced, with the largest species weighing about three times as much as the teratorn. Unlike extant condors and vultures, teratorns generally had long, eagle-like beaks and are believed to have been active predators. This is seemingly true as well of Argentavis but other teratorns were likely far less ponderous considering the substantial size differences. Argentavis may have used its wings and size to intimidate metatherian mammals and small phorusrhacids from their kills. Argentavis may have also ambushed some small live prey, i.e. large rodents, small armadillos and the young of large animals such as ground sloths. When hunting actively, A. magnificens would probably have swooped from high above onto their prey, which they usually would have been able to grab prey by its bill, kill, and swallow without landing. However, they may too have lain in wait from a ground position, which would render them likely grounded until heavy winds allowed them to fly. Skull structure suggests that it ate most of its prey whole rather than tearing off pieces of flesh.

References

Further reading 
 
 Wellnhofer, Peter (1996): The Illustrated Encyclopedia of Pterosaurs. Barnes and Noble Books, New York.

External links 
 Argentavis information Website about the Argentavis magnificens
 BBC News: Ancient American bird was glider – BBC News article
 How the dinosaur bird took to the skies – Daily Telegraph article
 Secret of flight for world's largest bird revealed – COSMOS magazine article
 Argentavis, the largest flying bird, was a master glider – Article from the blog Not Exactly Rocket Science

†Argentavis
Cerro Azul Formation
Fossil taxa described in 1980
Fossils of Argentina
Huayquerian
Miocene birds of South America
Neogene Argentina
Prehistoric bird genera
Teratornithidae